Charles Batcheller Neely Jr. (born December 11, 1943) is a former Republican member of the North Carolina General Assembly representing the State's 61st House district.

Career
In 1994, Neely was elected to the North Carolina House of Representatives. He was reelected in 1996 and 1998. He resigned from the State House on April 7, 1999. He ran for Governor of North Carolina in 2000, but came third in the Republican primary.

References

1943 births
Duke University School of Law alumni
Living people
Republican Party members of the North Carolina House of Representatives
North Carolina lawyers
People from Butler, New Jersey
University of North Carolina at Chapel Hill alumni
20th-century American politicians